The South Australian Chamber of Mines and Energy (SACOME) is a not-for-profit, non-government organisation founded in 1979. It represents approximately 130 companies involved in resource extraction and supporting service industries in South Australia.

The organisation has published a number of periodicals including the SA Mines and Energy journal, has been the subject of several feature articles in the resources sector magazine Australia's Paydirt, and released SACOME Priorities: State Election 2018 and 2024 Vision for the Resources Sector.

Advocacy

Port Bonython 
SACOME believes that the growth of iron ore mining in South Australia has been limited by the state's lack of bulk commodities port infrastructure. In 2011, SACOME's CEO Jason Kuchel publicly supported the chosen location for a future 3 km iron ore export wharf at Port Bonython, northeast of Whyalla in South Australia's upper Spencer Gulf region. The location is controversial due to its close proximity to breeding reef for the Northern Spencer Gulf population of giant Australian cuttlefish. The proposed port's potential environmental impact has been challenged by community groups including Save Point Lowly and the Alternative Port Working Party.

Since then other locations have been considered including the Iron Road Limited proposal at Cape Hardy on the Eyre Peninsula.

Nuclear power 
SACOME supports the future development of nuclear power in South Australia. Among its members are several companies actively involved in uranium mining and exploration. These include BHP, Areva Resources Australia, Heathgate Resources and Uranium SA. In 2014, SACOME's Chief Executive at the time, Jason Kuchel, believed that small modular nuclear reactors could potentially provide energy to remote resources projects, including at mine sites. Kuchel's advocacy was acknowledged by Australian Mining magazine as having influenced the establishment of the Nuclear Fuel Cycle Royal Commission in 2016.

Joint electricity purchasing group 
SACOME established an electricity buying group of 27 South Australian businesses in 2017 to secure reliable electricity supply arrangements for its members at competitive prices. On 8 June 2018, an eight-year supply contract was signed with renewable energy retailer SIMEC ZEN Energy.

Dirt TV awards 
In 2014, SACOME launched Dirt TV, a competition to encourage school students in years 7 to 12 to produce short videos creatively promoting the resources sector. The inaugural award was won by high school students James Haskard and Daniel Blake of Concordia College. 14 entries were received and resource company sponsors provided a total prize pool of $10,000. The competition ran from 2014 to 2016.

Council 
SACOME is governed by an elected council that comprises leaders from within the South Australian mining and energy industry.

The Councillors for 2020 are:

 Greg Hall (Rex Minerals) – President
 Matt Sherwell (Santos)
 Gabrielle Iwanow (OZ Minerals) 
 Varis Lidums (Minotaur Exploration) 
 Sarah Clarke (Piper Alderman) 
 Nicholas Mumford (Mumford Commercial Consulting) 
 Laura Tyler (BHP) 
 Mark Dayman (FYFE)
 Wendy Roxbee (Senex Energy) 
 Hamish Little (Iluka Resources) 
 Rebecca Knol (CEO, SACOME)

Past councils

2014:
 John Roberts – Mithril Resources (President)
 Terry Burgess – OZ Minerals (Vice President)
 Alice McCleary- Archer Exploration (Vice President)
 Simon Parsons – IMX Resources
 George McKenzie – Finlaysons
 Guy Roberts – Penrice Soda Products
 Mike Flynn – Santos
 David Cruickshanks-Boyd – Parsons Brinkerhoff
 Terry Kallis – Petratherm
 John McRae – Senex Energy 
 Darryl Cuzzubbo – BHP
 Joe Ranford – Terramin
 Andrew Stocks – Iron Road Limited 
 Yvonne Green – Iluka Resources

2015:
 John Roberts – Mithril Resources (President)
 Mike Flynn – Santos (Vice President)
 Yvonne Green – Iluka Resources (Vice President)
 George McKenzie – Finlaysons
 Darryl Cuzzubbo – BHP Billiton
 Terry Kallis – Kallis & Co
 Phil Cole – Senex Energy 
 Joe Ranford – Terramin
 Andrew Stocks – Iron Road Limited 
 Alison Snel – Flinders Port Holdings
 Greg Hall – Hillgrove Resources
 Patrick Mutz – Murray Zircon
 Jonathon Glew – Gypsum Resources
 Andrew Cole – OZ Minerals

2018: 
 Greg Hall – Rex Minerals (President)
 Jacqui McGill – BHP (Vice President)
 Rob Malinauskas – Beach Energy (Vice President)
Andrew Cannon – Adelaide Brighton Cement
Andrew Dyda – Finlaysons
Stewart Lammin – Flinders Port Holdings
Mark Dayman – FYFE
Steven McClare – Hillgrove Resources
Hamish Little – Iluka Resources
Andrew Cole – OZ Minerals
Nicole Galloway Warland – PepinNini Lithium
Matt Sherwell – Santos
Wendy Roxbee – Senex Energy
Vicki Brown

References 

Energy business associations
Trade associations based in Australia
Mining in South Australia
Mining organisations in Australia